Glenda Larke, born Glenyce Larke, is an Australian writer.

Biography
Larke grew up in Western Australia. She obtained a degree in history and a diploma in education at University of Western Australia and has taught English in Australia, Vienna, Tunisia and Malaysia.She currently resides in Mandurah, Western Australia with her husband, who works with the United Nations, and two children.

Larke's first novel, Havenstar was published in 1998 by Virgin Worlds in the UK under her married name of Glenda Noramly.

In 2003, she returned to the fantasy genre under the name of Glenda Larke when Voyager Books released The Aware, the first book in The Isles of Glory trilogy.  The Aware was a finalist in the 2003 Aurealis Awards fantasy division. Gilfeather and The Tainted completed the trilogy. The Tainted was a finalist in the 2004 Aurealis Awards fantasy division.

The Isles of Glory was shortly followed by Larke's second trilogy The Mirage Makers. It includes Heart of the Mirage, which was released in 2006 and was a finalist in the 2006 Aurealis Awards fantasy division, The Shadow of Tyr and Song of the Shiver Barrens, both released in 2007.

The Lascar's Dagger won both the Tin Duck Award and the Ditmar Award in 2015; The Fall of the Dagger won the Tin Duck Award in 2017.

The Watergivers (The Stormlord Trilogy) won the Sara Douglass Book Series Award in 2015.

Larke also writes non-fiction, usually articles on conservation issues, particularly those relating to bird conservation. These articles are mostly published in Malaysian nature magazines.

Bibliography
Havenstar (1998, as Glenda Noramly)

The Isles of Glory
The Aware (2003)
Gilfeather (2004)
The Tainted (2004)

The Mirage Makers
Heart of the Mirage (2006)
The Shadow of Tyr (2007)
Song of the Shiver Barrens (2007)

The Watergivers
Series also referred to as The Stormlord Trilogy
The Last Stormlord (2009)
Stormlord Rising (2010)
Stormlord's Exile (2011)

The Forsaken Lands
The Lascar's Dagger (2014)
The Dagger’s Path (2015)
The Fall of the Dagger (19 April 2016)

Awards and nominations

Aurealis Awards
Fantasy division
Finalist: The Aware (2003)
Finalist: The Tainted (2004)
Finalist: Heart of the Mirage (2006)
Finalist: Song of the Shiver Barrens (2007)
Finalist: The Last Stormlord (2009)
Finalist: Stormlord Rising (2010)
Finalist: Stormlord's Exile (2011)
Finalist: The Lascar's Dagger (2014)
Finalist: The Dagger's Path (2015)
Finalist: The Fall of the Dagger (2016)

References

External links
 
Blog

20th-century Australian novelists
21st-century Australian novelists
Australian fantasy writers
Australian non-fiction writers
Australian women novelists
Living people
Year of birth missing (living people)
Place of birth missing (living people)
Women science fiction and fantasy writers
20th-century Australian women writers
21st-century Australian women writers